Plestiodon parviauriculatus, the northern pigmy skink, is a species of lizard which is endemic to Mexico.

References

parviauriculatus
Reptiles of Mexico
Reptiles described in 1933
Taxa named by Edward Harrison Taylor